Wayne Briggs (born 24 June 1944) in Christchurch, New Zealand is a former speedway rider and a younger brother of Barry Briggs. He rode in the Provincial League with the Edinburgh Monarchs from 1961–1964 and 1965 in the British League. He then moved south and rode for Poole in 1966 and Exeter between 1967 and 1968. In 1969 he rejoined the Monarchs who were now based in Coatbridge. In 1970 he rode for Wembley and his final season was with Exeter.

In 1962 he finished second in the Provincial League Riders’ Championship and was regarded as a promising prospect for the future but a series of accidents and injuries affected his career. In 1968 and 1969 he represented New Zealand in test series with England.

References 

1944 births
Living people
New Zealand speedway riders
Sportspeople from Christchurch
Edinburgh Monarchs riders
Poole Pirates riders
Exeter Falcons riders
Wembley Lions riders